The West Sole gas field is a natural gas and associated condensate field located under the North Sea 44 miles (70 km) off the East Yorkshire coast. The field produced Britain’s first offshore natural gas in 1967.

The field 
The West Sole gas field is a substantial natural gas field located in the UK North Sea. The field is named after the Sole Pit area of the southern North Sea beneath which the field is situated. The gas reservoir is a Rotliegendes sandstone of Lower Permian age located at a depth of 9,000 feet (2,740 m) with a thickness of 262–430 feet (80–131 m). The reservoir is capped by Zechstein salt. The West Sole structure runs north-west to south-east and is about 12 miles long and 3 miles wide (19 km by 4.8 km). It was discovered in 1965 and extends over Block 48/6 only. The original determination of the gas in place amounted to 57 billion cubic metres. The field was originally licensed to BP Exploration UK Ltd, in 2012 ownership was transferred to Perenco UK Ltd. Production from the field began in March 1967; this was the first British offshore natural gas delivered onshore for commercial use. Gas and associated condensate are exported from the field via two pipelines (16 inch and 24 inch diameter) to the Easington gas terminal, East Yorkshire.

The West Sole gas composition and properties are as follows.

Development 
The West Sole and adjacent fields have been developed through a number of offshore installations.  

Some of these installations were one of the 'Villages' gas fields; named after villages lost to the sea along the Holderness coast. These villages include: Cleeton, Dimlington, Hoton, Hyde, Newsham and Ravenspurn.

Gas production from the fields is summarised on the table.

Note: mcm = million cubic metres, bcm = billion cubic metres.

The production profile, in mcm/y, of the West Sole field field was as shown. Up to the end of 1977 18,154 mcm had been produced.

See also 

 Indefatigable gas field
 Leman gas field
 Hewett gas field
Viking gas field
Clipper gas field

References 

Natural gas fields in the United Kingdom
North Sea energy